A total of 583 candidates contested the 2018 Lebanese general election, running on 77 lists.

Candidates by electoral district
Incumbent parliamentarians marked in bold italic.

Beirut I (East Beirut)

The Eastern first Beirut electoral district covers 4 quartiers (neighbourhoods) of the Lebanese capital: Achrafieh, Saifi, Rmeil and Medawar. The area is predominantly Christian; the largest community in the Beirut I electorate are Armenian Orthodox (28.33%). 19.2% are Greek Orthodox, 13.19% Maronite, 9.8% Greek Catholic, 9.76% Sunni, 5.57% Armenian Catholic, 3.95% Syriac Catholic, 3% Latin Catholics, 1.97% other Minorities groups, 2.88% Evangelicals, 1.99% Shia and 0.37% Druze or Alawite.

In first Beirut electoral district 5 lists were registered. After the split between the Future Movement and the Lebanese Forces, a joint list of the Free Patriotic Movement, the Armenian Revolutionary Federation (Tashnaq) and the Hunchaks was conceived ("Strong Beirut I") supported by the Future Movement. The Future Movement itself, however, stayed aloof from fielding candidates. The Lebanese Forces, together with the Kataeb Party, Ramgavars and Michel Pharaon, and with support from Antoun Sehnaoui, fielded their list under the label "Beirut I". Michelle Tueni fielded a third list, "We Are Beirut", being joined by incumbent Future MP Serge Torsarkissian.

For the Minorities seat the FPM fielded a Syriac Orthodox candidate, former Brigadier General Antoine Pano, whilst the Tueni list includes Latin Catholic candidate Rafic Bazerji, an independent from a family historically close to the National Liberal Party.

Beirut II (West Beirut)

The Western second Beirut electoral district covers 8 quartiers (neighbourhoods) of the Lebanese capital: Ain El Mreisseh, Bachoura, Mazraa, Minet El Hosn, Moussaitbeh, Port, Ras Beirut and Zuqaq al-Blat. The electorate is predominantly Sunni (62.1%). 20.6% are Shia, 5% Greek Orthodox, 3.41% Minorities, 1.86% Maronite, 1.65% Armenian Orthodox, 1.63% Greek Catholic, 1.55% Druze, 1.31% Jews, 0.81% Evangelical (Protestant) and 0.03% Alawite.

In second Beirut electoral district 9 lists were registered. In the 2009 election, the Future Movement had won the election in West Beirut. But this time, a number of lists seeks to challenge the Future dominance over the Sunni electorate, "Beirut al-Watan" (alliance of al-Jamaa al-Islamiah and Al Liwaa newspaper editor Salah Salam), "Beiruti Opposition" (fielded by Ashraf Rifi), "Lebnan Herzen", "We are All Beirut" and "Dignity of Beirut" (led by former judge Khaled Hammoud).

The erstwhile March 8 bloc split into two lists. Hezbollah, Amal, Al-Ahbash and the Free Patriotic Movement fielded the "Unity of Beirut" list, whilst the People's Movement and Al-Mourabitoun fielded the "Voice of the People" list. Omar Ghandour, candidate of the Islamic Action Front, prominent businessman and former president of the Nejmeh Sporting Club, was named president of "Unity of Beirut" list. The SSNP faction of Ali Haidar fielded a candidate on the "Voice of the People" list. Naamat Badruddin, also on the "Voice of the People" list was a leader during the 2015 trash protest movement.

Under the previous electoral law the Future Movement could easily win landslides in West Beirut. But under the new electoral law analysts argued that the Future Movement could lose a number of seats. Apart from the Hezbollah-Amal-FPM list (expected to win the Shia vote), the main perceived challengers to the Future Movement were the "Beirut al-Watan" list and the "Lebnan Herzen" list of prominent businessman Fouad Makhzoumi. Nevertheless, the Beirut al-Watan list included several figures close to the Hariri family and Salam pledged to support the "Sunni za'im" Hariri to remain Prime Minister of Lebanon.

Prior to the deadline to register lists, the Lebanese Democratic Party announced the withdrawal of its candidate for the Druze seat. Likewise the Lebanese People's Congress, which had initially intended to field Samir Kneo on the Amal-Hezbollah list, withdrew from the race.

Bekaa I (Zahle)

The electorate in the first Bekaa electoral district is predominantly Christian. Ahead of the 2018 elections, electoral district had 172,555 registered voters; 28.32% Sunni, 15.96% Shi, 0.53% Druze, 18.72% Greek Catholic, 15.68% Maronite, 9.54% Greek Orthodox, 4.99% Armenian Orthodox, 3.85% Syriac Orthodox and Syriac Catholic, 1.07% Armenian Catholic, 0.78% Evangelical and 0.57% from other sects.

In the Zahle electoral district 5 lists were registered. An alliance of Free Patriotic Movement, Future Movement, Tashnaq and independents was announced with the candidature name "Zahle for All". Lebanese Forces and the Kataeb Party fielded the "Zahle is Our Cause" list. There were also the "Popular Bloc" list led by Mariam Skaff, "Zahle Options and Decisions" led by Nicolas Fattouch (including a Hezbollah candidate) and the civil society list Kulluna Watani.

Rifi did not field a list in Zahle, as he failed to reach an alliance with Kataeb and Lebanese Forces on the matter.

Bekaa II (West Bekaa-Rachaya)

In the second Bekaa electoral district, nearly half of the electorate is Sunni (48.8%). 14.8% of the electorate is Druze, 14.7% Shia, 7.42% Greek Catholic, 7.22% Maronite and 7.16% Greek Orthodox.

In the West Bekaa-Rachaya electoral district 3 lists were registered. The Future Movement and the Progressive Socialist Party formed a joint list. Notably this list included Mohammed Qar'awi, owner of the Bekaa Hospital, a personality previously linked to the March 8 Alliance. Amin Wahbi, founder and leader of the Democratic Left Movement was included on the Future list.

The "Best Tomorrow" list is mainly backed by the Amal Movement. In the end the Free Patriotic Movement did not join the Amal-sponsored list, leaving Greek Orthodox candidate Elie Ferzli to join it as an individual.

TV presenter Maguy Aoun is heading a third list, organized by civil society elements.

The Lebanese Forces had tried to form a list with Ashraf Rifi to contest the election, but such a list did not materialize. Likewise, the Lebanese Democratic Party opted to withdrawal its candidate Dr. Nizar Zaki.

Bekaa III (Baalbek–Hermel)

The electorate in the electoral district is predominantly Shia (73.3%). 13.3% are Sunni, 7.35% Maronite, 5.36% Greek Catholic and 0.72% Greek Orthodox. In Baalbek–Hermel electoral district 5 lists were registered. The "Hope and Loyalty" list gathers Hezbollah, Amal and the Syrian Social Nationalist Party. Its main challenger is expected to be the "Dignity and Development" list of the Lebanese Forces and the Future Movement. The Free Patriotic Movement had tried to form a list together with former speaker Hussein el-Husseini, but after el-Husseini pulled out from the electoral fray the alliance broke down and resulted in two separate lists: the "Development and Change" list and the "Independent" list. The Free Patriotic Movement candidates joined the list led by the former regional secretary of the Baath Party, Faiz Shukr.

Mount Lebanon I (Byblos–Kesrwan)

In Byblos–Kesrwan electoral district 5 lists were registered. The lists in the fray are the "Strong Lebanon" (supported by Free Patriotic Movement), the "National Solidarity" (Hezbollah), the "Anna al-Qarar" list (alliance between Kataeb Party, Fares Souhaid, Farid Heikal Al Khazen and independents, supported by Marada Movement), the "Clear Change" list (supported by Lebanese Forces) and the "Kulluna Watani" (We are all National) list.

In difference with previous elections, FPM and Hezbollah did not join forces on a common list. Hezbollah fielded its own list, with a Shia candidate (Hussein Zuaitar) from Baalbek. The Alliance National list included the former Telecommunications Minister Jean Louis Cardahi and dissident FPM politician Bassam Hachem, Hezbollah candidate and 4 other independents.

The FPM list was led by General Chamel Roukoz, with World Maronite Foundation president Neemat Frem, former minister Ziad Baroud and former parliamentarian Mansour al-Bon, amongst others.

The Kataeb-Souhaid supported list sought to include personalities from civil society. It included former National Bloc general secretary Jean Hawat. There was resistance from Kataeb side to field incumbent parliamentarians Youssef Khalil and Gilberte Zouein, since they were linked to the Change and Reform Bloc.

The "Kulluna Watani" (We are all National) list included former minister Youssef Salame.

The electorate is predominantly Christian; Maronites make up 82.1% of the electorate, 10.7% Shia, 1.91% Greek Orthodox, 1.4% Armenian Orthodox, 1.32% Sunni, 1.32% Greek Catholic and 1.26% other Christian communities.

Mount Lebanon II (Metn)

Mount Lebanon II is a predominantly Christian electoral district; 44.8% of the electorate is Maronite, 14.6% Greek Orthodox, 14.3% Armenian Orthodox, 9.83% Greek Catholic, 3.86% Armenian Catholic and 6.28% other Christian communities. 3.03% of the electorate is Shia, 1.88% Sunni and 1.38% Druze.

In Metn electoral district 5 lists were registered. Michel Murr fielded the list "Metn Loyalty". The Kataeb Party fielded its list under the label "Pulse Metn" together with the National Liberal Party and civil society personalities, the Lebanese Forces and allies contest under the label "Metn Heart of Lebanon" and an alliance of the Free Patriotic Movement-Syrian Social Nationalist Party-Tashnaq fielded the "Strong Metn" list.

The Communist Party had been in discussions with civil society activists on forming a list labelled "Nawar al-Metn", but the initiative did not materialize.

Mount Lebanon III (Baabda)

In Baabda electoral district 4 lists were registered. Whilst the Free Patriotic Movement and the March 8 coalition had gone separate ways in most electoral districts, they managed to form a joint list in Baabda under the label "National Reconciliation". The other main list in the fray is the "Unity and Development of Baabda" list, an alliance of the Progressive Socialist Party, the Lebanese Forces, independents and Salah Harakeh, supported by the Future Movement. There are also two civil society lists. The "Together for Baabda" list was presented by Kataeb chief Sami Gemayel and NLP chief Dory Chamoun on March 3, 2018, a list including civil society activists and environmentalists. It includes the founder of Terre-Liban and the Lebanese Ecological Movement, a platform of NGOs, Paul Abi Rached as one of its candidates.

36.8% of the electorate is Maronite, 25.2% Shia, 17.6% Druze, 7.61% Greek Orthodox, 6.11% Sunni, 4.6% Greek Catholic and 2.14% belong to other Christian communities.

Mount Lebanon IV (Aley–Chouf)

In Aley–Chouf electoral district 6 lists were registered. 40.5% of the electorate is Druze, 27% Maronite, 18.7% Sunni, 5.18% Greek Catholic, 5.14% Greek Orthodox, 2.6% Shia and 0.91% belongs to other Christian communities.

The battle was expected to be mainly between two lists: the "Reconciliation" (Progressive Socialist Party-Future Movement-Lebanese Forces) list and the "Mountain Pledge" (Lebanese Democratic Party-Free Patriotic Movement-Syrian Social Nationalist Party) list. The remaining lists were the "Free Decision" (Kataeb Party and National Liberal Party) list, the "National Unity" list of Wiam Wahhab (former Minister, ex-LDP), the "Civic" list and the "Kulluna Watani" (We are all National) list.

Towards the end of February the Democratic Renewal Movement candidate Antoine Haddad announced his withdrawal from the race.

North I (Akkar)

In Akkar 6 lists were registered. The Future Movement opted for a list of its own (with Lebanese Forces candidate Qatisha as candidate for a Greek Orthodox seat). There is also a list supported by March 8 coalition "The Decision for Akkar" (headed by ex-MP Wajih Barini, in alliance with the Marada Movement and the Arab Democratic Party), the "Decision of Akkar" list, the "Strong Akkar" list (Free Patriotic Movement, al-Jamaa al-Islamiah, pro-Future independents), "Sovereign Lebanon" list (led by Ashraf Rifi) and the "Women of Akkar" list.

The electorate is predominantly Sunni (67.5%). 14.7% of the electorate is Greek Orthodox, 10.9% Maronite, 4.97% Alawite, 1.05% Shia, 0.62% Greek Catholic and 0.29% from other Christian communities.

North II (Tripoli–Minnieh–Dennieh)

Under the previous electoral law, Tripoli and Minnieh-Dennieh constituted two different constituencies. The electorate is predominantly Sunni (82.91%), with significant minorities of Greek Orthodox (6.24%), Alawites (6.04%) and Maronites (3.5%). 0.51% of the electorate are Armenian Orthodox, 0.32% Armenian Catholics and 0.59% belong to other Christian communities.

With the new election law in place, the heavyweights of Tripoli politics went in different directions. Justifying the decision to head to the polls alone, the Future Movement general secretary Ahmed Hariri stated that "[w]e will form our own list because we came to understand that a lot of people had taken advantage of us...". All in all, 8 lists were registered in the second northern electoral district; the "Determination" list of former Prime Minister Najib Mikati, the Future Movement list, a list led by Ashraf Rifi, the "National Dignity" list (alliance between Faisal Karami and Jihad Samad, with participation of Al-Ahbash and Marada Movement), the "People's Decision" list (alliance between Free Patriotic Movement and Kamal Kheir, joined by independents), the "Kulluna Watani" (We are all National) list (Sabaa Party, Movement of Citizens in the State, Socialist Arab Lebanon Vanguard Party, Resistance Movement and independents), the "Independent Decision" list (alliance between al-Jamaa al-Islamiah, ex-parliamentarian Mesbah Ahdab and independents) and the "Independent Civil Society" List (independents). Mohammad Safadi opted to stay out of the electoral race, calling for support to the Future list. Safadi announced his decision at a press conference at the Safadi Cultural Center.

In Dennieh, the 28-year old Sami Fatfat overtook his father Ahmad Fatfat's mantle as the Future Movement candidate.

Mikati launched his "Determination" list at an electoral meeting at the Quality Inn Hotel in Tripoli on March 18, 2018. Amongst his candidates were former minister Jean Obeid and Nicolas Nahas and incumbent Future parliamentarian Kazim Kheir. Kheir was denied the Minnieh spot on the Future Movement list, a move that pushed him to join the Mikati list instead.

North III (Bcharre–Zghorta–Batroun–Koura)

In third northern electoral district 4 lists were registered. The "Strong North" list, headed by Gebran Bassil, gathers the Free Patriotic Movement, the Independence Movement, the Future Movement, the "Strong Republic Pulse" gathers the Lebanese Forces, the Kataeb Party and the Democratic Left Movement, the "With Us for the North and Lebanon", gathering the Marada Movement, the Syrian Social Nationalist Party and Boutros Harb whilst the civil society list "Kulluna Watani" (We are all National) gathers the Movement of Citizens in the State, Sabaa Party and Sah.

The electorate is predominantly Christian; 68.1% are Maronite, 20.7% Greek Orthodox, 8.94% Sunni, 0.93% Shia, 0.73% Greek Catholic, 0.38% from other Christian communities and 0.24% Alawite.

South I (Saida–Jezzine)

In the Saida–Jezzine electoral district, four candidate lists crystallized: "Integration and Dignity" (Future Movement and independents), "Saida and Jezzine Together" (alliance between al-Jamaa al-Islamiah, Free Patriotic Movement and Dr. Abdul Rahman Bizri), "For All People" (alliance between Popular Nasserite Organization and Ibrahim Azar, supported by Amal Movement and Hezbollah) and the "Capacity of Change" List (alliance between Kataeb Party, Lebanese Forces and the March 11 Group).

The Future Movement and the Free Patriotic Movement had tried to negotiate an electoral pact, but reportedly FPM had insisted on keeping Bizri on their list. After the dialogue with Future broke down, FPM reached out to al-Jamaa al-Islamiah, since the Popular Nasserite Organization had already concluded a pact with Ibrahim Azar (an independent Maronite supported by Amal-Hezbollah alliance).

44.2% of the electorate is Sunni, 30.8% Maronite, 15.1% Shia, 8.69% Greek Catholic, 0.67% from other Christian communities and 0.48% Druze.

South II (Zahrany–Tyre)

In second southern electoral district 2 lists were registered. The "Hope and Loyalty" (Amal-Hezbollah) list led by Nabih Berri is challenged by the "Together for Change" list (an alliance of Riad Al-Assaad, the Lebanese Communist Party and independents).

The electorate is predominantly Shia (81.4%). 6.81% of the electorare is Greek Catholic, 6.1% Sunni, 4.55% Maronite and 1.14% belong to other Christian communities.

South III (Marjaayoun–Hasbaya–Nabatieh–Bint Jbeil)

In third southern electoral district 6 lists were registered. The electorate is predominantly Shia (80.1%). 6.35% of the electorate is Sunni, 5.27% Maronite, 3.65% Druze, 2.45% Greek Orthodox, 1.8% Greek Catholic and 0.39% from other Christian communities.

The Amal-Hezbollah coalition fielded the "Hope and Loyalty" list. It includes a Baathist Sunni candidate, Kassem Hachem, who is fielded as Amal candidate and officially not sponsored by the Baath Party.

The Future Movement, the Free Patriotic Movement and the Lebanese Democratic Party fielded a joint list called "The South is Worth It", a list that L'Orient Le Jour labelled "supplementary" to the Amal-Hezbollah list. It includes a pro-Future independent Sunni candidate, Imad Khatib, who has business links to Amal leader Berri. Three Shia candidates (Badruddin, Sharafuddin and Osseiran) were previously close to Hezbollah. Two pro-FPM independent candidates were included in the list, Chadi Massaad (Greek Orthodox) and Mourhaf Ramadan (Shia). Druze candidate Dr. Wissam Charouf is a member of the Political Council of the Lebanese Democratic Party.

"A Vote for Change" list was fielded by the Lebanese Communist Party, the Communist Action Organization in Lebanon and independents. It includes a pro-SSNP independent candidate, Hussein Baydoun. The "National" coalition fielded a list with five candidates.

The two remaining of the lists in the fray took a more confrontative approach towards the Hezbollah-Amal dominance of the local political scene. The "Shibna Hakki" list was fielded by the Lebanese Forces and Shia dissidents, with the Shia journalist Ali Al-Amin on the list. Al-Amin had been publicly labelled as one of the "Shia of the [U.S.] Embassy" by Hezbollah general secretary Nasrallah. Al-Amin and fellow candidate and journalist Imad Komeyha, had been signatories to the 2017 call for fresh elections to the High Shia Council. Ahmed Assaad, leader of the Lebanese Option Party, fielded an anti-Hezbollah list of his own with candidates from his party. The list included Al-Assaad's wife Abeer Ramadan.

Result by candidate

See also 

 2018 Lebanese general election
 2022 Lebanese general election

References

Lists of Lebanese political candidates